Stecchericium is a genus of fungi in the family Bondarzewiaceae. The genus is widespread in tropical regions.

References

External links

Russulales
Russulales genera